Benjamin Eberle (born 3 March 1963) is a Liechtensteiner cross-country skier who competed in the 1988 Winter Olympics.

References

External links

1963 births
Living people
Liechtenstein male cross-country skiers
Olympic cross-country skiers of Liechtenstein
Cross-country skiers at the 1988 Winter Olympics
Place of birth missing (living people)
20th-century Liechtenstein people